The Ambassador Extraordinary and Plenipotentiary of the Russian Federation to Singapore is the official representative of the President and the Government of the Russian Federation to the President and the Government of Singapore.

The ambassador and his staff work at large in the Embassy of Russia in Singapore.

History of diplomatic relations

Diplomatic relations at the mission level between the Soviet Union and Singapore were first established on 1 June 1968.  The first ambassador, was appointed on 18 December 1968, and presented his credentials on 23 January 1969. With the dissolution of the Soviet Union in 1991, the Soviet ambassador, continued as representative of the Russian Federation until 1994.

List of representatives (1968–present)

Representatives of the Soviet Union to Singapore (1968–1991)

Representatives of the Russian Federation to Singapore (1991–present)

References

External links

 
Singapore
Russia